Susan Snowdon (born 1 April 1951) is a former teacher and magistrate. She is the current Lord Lieutenant of Durham and the first woman to hold that post.

Early life
Snowdon was born on 1 April 1951. Her father was a shop-keeper.

Career
Snowdon was a primary school teacher in Chilton and Ferryhill, County Durham. In 1989, in order to advance her career and become a deputy head teacher, she underwent a medical. This showed that her aortic valve "had completely perished" and she required immediate surgery to prevent her death by Christmas of that year. The surgery, in which a metal valve was successfully fitted, saved her life. However, such a major health issue meant that she could no longer teach.

On 3 August 2006, she was commissioned a Deputy Lieutenant (DL) in the County of Durham. On 8 March 2013, she was appointed Lord Lieutenant of County Durham, becoming the Queen's representative in the county. She succeeded Sir Paul Nicholson to become the county's 30th Lord Lieutenant.

Personal life
She is married to Keith Snowdon, a farmer.

References

1951 births
Lord-Lieutenants of Durham
Schoolteachers from County Durham
Living people